Yaza Dewi was a junior queen consort of King Mingyi Nyo of Toungoo and the mother of King Tabinshwehti. Born Khin Oo to the village chief of Le Way, she became a concubine of the king in 1515. After she bore him his first and only son, the king raised the teenage commoner to the rank of queen with the style of Yaza Dewi.

References

Bibliography
 

Queens consort of Toungoo dynasty
16th-century Burmese women